Goose Island State Park is a state park in the U.S. state of Texas, located north of the city of Rockport on the coast of the Gulf of Mexico. It is surrounded by both St. Charles and Aransas Bays.

The park was established on land acquired from private owners between the years 1931–35. The Civilian Conservation Corps built the earliest facilities.

The park is home to "The Big Tree", a Southern live oak (Quercus virginiana), thought to be over 1000 years old.

Although it is located on the seashore, there is no designated swimming area at the park, as the shoreline consists of concrete, oyster shell, mudflat, and marsh grass. Instead, the main park activities include camping, birding, fishing, and boating. The park averages more than 60,000 overnight campers each year and has about 200,000 visitors annually. There are 45 shade shelters with electricity and water on the island. There are 57 shelters with electricity and water, and 27 with water and no electricity. Speckled trout, redfish, drum, flounder, and sheepshead are a few of the fish caught.

See also
Aransas National Wildlife Refuge
Copano Bay Fishing Pier
Mustang Island State Park
George W. Fulton Mansion
List of Texas state parks
Texas Maritime Museum
Texas State Aquarium

References

Links 

 Film segment about Goose Island State Park in Exploring the Texas State Park System from the Texas Archive of the Moving Image

State parks of Texas
Protected areas of Aransas County, Texas
Civilian Conservation Corps in Texas